St. Ouen's Manor is a manor house in the parish of St. Ouen, Jersey, and is the traditional home of the Seigneur of St. Ouen, and the ancestral home of the De Carteret family.

The earliest record of the house dates from 1135.

As a part of the 1940 Jersey local elections, the manor was offered to the victor, Edward Campbell. However, Campbell became disillusioned with the idea, and declined.

The house and grounds remain intact today, and the house is a private home for the De Carteret family.  It is occasionally open to the public.

See also
 Samarès Manor

References

Manor houses in Jersey
Buildings and structures in Saint Ouen, Jersey